The Billabong Pro Teahupoo 2015 was an event of the Association of Surfing Professionals for 2015 ASP World Tour.

This event was held from 08 to 19 July at Teahupo'o, (Tahiti, French Polynesia) and opposed by 36 surfers.

The tournament was won by Jérémy Florès (FRA), who beat Gabriel Medina (BRA) in final.

Round 1

Round 2

Round 3

Round 4

Round 5

Quarter finals

Semi finals

Final

References

2015 World Surf League
Tahiti Pro
2015 in French Polynesian sport